Salmonid herpesvirus 3 (SalHV-3) is a species of virus in the genus Salmonivirus, family Alloherpesviridae, and order Herpesvirales.

References 

Alloherpesviridae